Hyperlais nemausalis is a species of moth in the family Crambidae described by Philogène Auguste Joseph Duponchel in 1834. It is found in France, Spain, Italy and Greece.

The wingspan is 15–18 mm.

References

Moths described in 1834
Cybalomiinae
Moths of Europe
Moths of Asia